"A Picture of Me (Without You)" is a country music song written by Norro Wilson and George Richey.

Background
According to Rich Kienzle's liner notes for the 1994 Sony retrospective The Essential George Jones: The Spirit of Country, the song was written specifically for Jones with co-writer Norro Wilson singing the song for George "imitating the Jones style to show how he wanted it sung.  Even with the string arrangement, the country feel remained undiminished". The song is similar to an older Webb Pierce song called "That's Me Without You".  It was originally recorded by Jones, whose version peaked at #5 on the Billboard Hot Country Singles chart in 1972.  In his 1995 autobiography I Lived to Tell It All, Jones quoted lines from the song to describe his own sadness at the passing of his brother-in-law W.T. "Dub" Scroggins in 1993.

The song was covered by Lorrie Morgan on her 1991 album Something in Red. Morgan's version was released as the album's second single in June 1991 and reached #9 on the Billboard Hot Country Singles & Tracks chart in November 1991.

Content
In the song, the narrator tells his lover to imagine incomplete things, like "a world where no music is playing, a church where nobody's praying, a sky with no blue, and by seeing this, she can see his picture without her by his side.

Other versions
The song was also recorded in 2007, as a duet, by Vern Gosdin and Kimber Sparks.

Chart performance

George Jones

Lorrie Morgan

Year-end charts

References 

1972 singles
1991 singles
George Jones songs
Lorrie Morgan songs
Songs written by Norro Wilson
Songs written by George Richey
Song recordings produced by Billy Sherrill
Epic Records singles
RCA Records singles
Song recordings produced by Richard Landis
1972 songs